XHCSI-FM / XECSI-AM is a radio station on 89.5 FM and 750 AM in Culiacán, Sinaloa, Mexico. It is owned by Radiorama and is known as Romántica with a romantic format.

History
XECSI-AM 750 received its concession on March 15, 1991. It operated with 1,000 watts during the day and at night with 250 watts. XECSI migrated to FM in 2010 as XHCSI-FM 89.5. The station had a continuity obligation decreed in 2014, but a 2018 IFT study found that other stations served all of the listeners that were in its AM coverage area.

XHCSI-FM was known as Éxtasis Digital between 2012 and 2015, with an English classic hits format. It then switched to its current romantic format.

References

External links
Radiorama Radio Stations

Radio stations in Sinaloa